Waiwhakaiho is an industrial suburb of New Plymouth, in the Taranaki region, on the west coast of New Zealand's North Island.

It is located near the mouth of the Waiwhakaiho River, on the eastern side of the city.

The oldest housing in the area dates back to the 1910s, but most housing was built in the 2010s.

A new walkway was also completed in Waiwhakiho in the 2010s.

Demographics

Waiwhakaiho-Bell Block South had a population of 105 at the 2018 New Zealand census, a decrease of 12 people (−10.3%) since the 2013 census, and a decrease of 18 people (−14.6%) since the 2006 census. There were 27 households, comprising 60 males and 42 females, giving a sex ratio of 1.43 males per female. The median age was 38.8 years (compared with 37.4 years nationally), with 24 people (22.9%) aged under 15 years, 18 (17.1%) aged 15 to 29, 60 (57.1%) aged 30 to 64, and 3 (2.9%) aged 65 or older.

Ethnicities were 80.0% European/Pākehā, 20.0% Māori, 8.6% Asian, and 2.9% other ethnicities. People may identify with more than one ethnicity.

The percentage of people born overseas was 17.1, compared with 27.1% nationally.

Although some people chose not to answer the census's question about religious affiliation, 45.7% had no religion, 45.7% were Christian, 2.9% had Māori religious beliefs, 2.9% were Hindu and 2.9% had other religions.

Of those at least 15 years old, 3 (3.7%) people had a bachelor's or higher degree, and 15 (18.5%) people had no formal qualifications. The median income was $33,000, compared with $31,800 nationally. 9 people (11.1%) earned over $70,000 compared to 17.2% nationally. The employment status of those at least 15 was that 45 (55.6%) people were employed full-time, 12 (14.8%) were part-time, and 6 (7.4%) were unemployed.

Marae

Katere Ki-Te-Moana Marae, a meeting place for the Te Āti Awa hapū of Ngāti Tāwhirikura, is located on Cody Place.

New Plymouth District Council received a grant request from the marae in 2017.

In October 2020, the Government committed $264,935 from the Provincial Growth Fund to upgrade the marae, creating an estimated 15 jobs.

Economy

The Valley Mega Centre opened in Waiwhakaiho in 2006. It has five tenants: Mitre 10 Mega,  Countdown, Rebel Sport, Briscoes and Noel Leeming.

References

Suburbs of New Plymouth